Villa is an Italian and Spanish surname. Notable people with the surname include:

 David Villa (born 1981), Spanish footballer
 Edoardo Villa (1915–2011), Italian-South African artist
 Emmanuel Villa (born 1982), Argentine footballer
 Javier Villa (born 1987), Spanish racing driver
 Joy Villa (born 1986), American singer
 Marco Villa (born 1969), Italian cyclist
 Pancho Villa (1878–1923), Mexican revolutionary 
 Ricardo Villa (born 1952), Argentine footballer
 Rodolfo Martín Villa (born 1934), Spanish politician
 Sebastián Villa (born 1992), Colombian diver
 Sebastián Villa Cano (born 1996), Colombian footballer
 Tom Villa (1945-2023), American politician

See also
 José Doroteo Arango Arámbula (1878–1923), Mexican revolutionary general known as Francisco/Pancho Villa
Villa
Villas (disambiguation)
Vila (disambiguation)
Vilas (disambiguation)
Villar (surname)

Spanish-language surnames
Italian-language surnames